The Church of St. Lawrence is a church in Lohja, Finland.  It is the third largest medieval parish church in Finland. The murals from early 16th century make it one of the most valuable medieval buildings in Finland.  The rustic and naive murals  depicted biblical stories for the illiterate population.

Description

Prior to the Protestant Reformation and the introduction of Lutheranism into Finland, the church served the Roman Catholic Church.  The church is dedicated to Lawrence of Rome.

On the southeast corner of the church is a bell tower. Its grey stone foot is probably from the Middle Ages. The wooden parts of the bell tower were given their present form during the vast reparations after the Great Northern War. The construction of the upper part was overseen by German master builder Johann Friedrich Schultz around year 1740. The tower houses three bells, the oldest of which was cast in Tallinn in 1594. The largest of the bells was cast in Lohja in 1624 and the smallest was cast in Stockholm in 1740.

In early 19th century the church windows were made larger and the paintings were covered with white chalk colour. In 1880s the white paint was removed and colourful figures were repaired.

Gallery

See also 
 St. Lawrence Church, Vantaa

References 

Lutheran churches in Finland
Lutheran churches converted from Roman Catholicism
Medieval stone churches in Finland